is a passenger railway station in located in the city of Suzuka,  Mie Prefecture, Japan, operated by the private railway operator Kintetsu Railway.

Lines
Suzukashi Station is a station on the Suzuka Line, and is located 4.1 rail kilometers from the opposing terminus of the line at Ise-Wakamatsu Station.

Station layout
The station consists of two opposed side platforms connected by a level crossing.

Platforms

Adjacent stations

History
The Ise Railway became the Sangu Express Electric Railway’s Ise-Kambe Line on September 15, 1936, and was renamed the Nagoya Line on December 7, 1938. After merging with Osaka Electric Kido on March 15, 1941, the line became the Kansai Express Railway's Nagoya Line. This line was merged with the Nankai Electric Railway on June 1, 1944, to form Kintetsu. The line was renamed the Suzuka Line on April 8, 1963, at which time the station was renamed to its present name.

Passenger statistics
In fiscal 2019, the station was used by an average of 1935 passengers daily (boarding passengers only).

Surrounding area
Suzuka City Hall
Kambe Castle ruins

See also
List of railway stations in Japan

References

External links

Kintetsu: Suzukashi Station

Railway stations in Japan opened in 1925
Railway stations in Mie Prefecture
Stations of Kintetsu Railway
Suzuka, Mie